The 2016–17 Seton Hall Pirates women's basketball team represented Seton Hall University during the 2016–17 NCAA Division I women's basketball season. The Pirates, led by fourth head coach Anthony Bozzella, played their home games in South Orange, New Jersey at the Walsh Gymnasium and were members of the Big East Conference. They finished the season 12–19, 4–14 in Big East play to finish in a tie for seventh place. They advanced to the quarterfinals of the Big East women's tournament where they lost to DePaul.

Roster

Schedule

|-
!colspan=9 style="background:#0000FF; color:#D3D3D3;"| Exhibition

|-
!colspan=9 style="background:#0000FF; color:#D3D3D3;"| Non-conference regular season

|-
!colspan=9 style="background:#0000FF; color:#D3D3D3;"| Big East regular season

|-
!colspan=9 style="background:#0000ff; color:#D3D3D3;"| Big East Women's Tournament

See also
 2016–17 Seton Hall Pirates men's basketball team

References

Seton Hall
Seton Hall Pirates women's basketball seasons